Erandio is a town and municipality located in the province of Biscay, in the autonomous community of Basque Country, northern Spain.
The name comes from euskera ARANDIO that means plum plantation or field.

In 1415, during the War of the Bands, the corregidor, the royally-appointed governor of the Biscayan hermandad, acting on royal orders, siphoned off Biscayan wheat to the Asturias, inciting a rebellion. The Biscayans were defeated at Erandio with the loss of sixty men and the wheat transfers continued.

Festivals
Several annual festivals are celebrated in Erandio. Most of them are fiestas patronales (patronage festivals, held in the days around the date dedicated to the patron saints under whose advocation churches and hermits are).
The local public holiday of the municipality rotates yearly on August 10, August 28 and the corpus Christi day.

 June 11, Saint Barnabas in Fano / Faoeta.
 June 13, Saint Anthony of Padua in Martiartu, Goierri.
 June 29, Saint Peter in Kukularra.
 July 3, Saint Tryphon in Arriaga.
 July 10, Saint Christopher in Goierri.
 Second half of July in Asua.
 August 10, Saint Lawrence in Astrabudua.
 August 15, Andra Maria (Our Lady Mary) in Erandio Goikoa (August 15, the day of the Assumption of the Virgin Mary is a public holiday in Spain).
 August 17 and 18: Saint Mammes in Santimami (Saint Mammes' hermit lies on the municipal border and most of the festival acts are held on Leioa's ground).
 August 29, Saint Augustine in Altzaga.
 First week of September in Enekuri.
 Third week of September in Lutxana.

Erandio has also celebrated a street music festival called Musikale, with music bands marching and playing in the neighbourhoods of Altzaga and Astrabudua. Musikale was originally conceived in the neighbouring municipality of Leioa. For some years it was held simultaneously in Leioa, Erandio, Basauri and Sestao, but the other municipalities dropped it, and in 2013 only Erandio organised it.

Transport
Erandio is connected to other municipalities of Biscay (like Barakaldo, Bermeo, Bilbao, Derio, Getxo, Larrabetzu, Laukiz, Leioa, Mungia and Muskiz) by Bizkaibus bus services  and by line 1 of the Bilbao metro, which has three stations in Erandio (Lutxana, Erandio, and Astrabudua). It is also connected to Barakaldo by regular fluvial transport over the Estuary of Bilbao.

Notable people 
 Ramon Rubial (1906–1999), politician.
 Rafael Eguzkiza (1912–1981), footballer
 Telmo Zarra (1921–2006), footballer
 Luis María Echeberría (1940–2016), footballer
 Alex Angulo (1953–2014), actor
 Sendoa Agirre (1975–), footballer
 Vicente Lapatza (1927–), footballer

References

External links

 ERANDIO in the Bernardo Estornés Lasa – Auñamendi Encyclopedia (Euskomedia Fundazioa) 

Municipalities in Biscay
Estuary of Bilbao